Poetry Please is a weekly radio programme broadcast on BBC Radio 4 in which listeners request poems, which are then read by a cast of actors. It is broadcast on Sunday afternoons and repeated the following Saturday night. The current presenter is Roger McGough, himself a poet. Performers regularly include some of the top names in British acting, such as Judi Dench, Ian McKellen, Prunella Scales and Timothy West.

The programme marked its 40th year in 2019 and is known to be the longest running poetry programme broadcast anywhere in the world.

McGough's predecessor as presenter of Poetry Please was the Irish broadcaster and writer Frank Delaney.  He described his pleasure in working on the programme, saying:

As of 2013, the most frequently-requested and broadcast poem was Stopping by Woods on a Snowy Evening by Robert Frost.

References

External links
Poetry Please website
Poetry Please: The Nation's Best-Loved Poems: a tie-in volume of poems from the radio programme, published by Faber & Faber with a foreword by Roger McGough.

BBC Radio 4 programmes